Picrella is a genus of flowering plants belonging to the family Rutaceae.

Its native range is New Caledonia.

Species:

Picrella glandulosa 
Picrella ignambiensis 
Picrella trifoliata

References

Zanthoxyloideae
Zanthoxyloideae genera